Malicheh (also Romanized as Mālīcheh) is a village in Japelaq-e Gharbi Rural District, Japelaq District, Azna County, Lorestan Province, Iran. At the 2006 census, its population was 402, in 103 families.

References 

Towns and villages in Azna County